Marcel Amondji (born 1934) is the pseudonym of an Ivorian writer. After spending his childhood in Bingerville, he travelled to France to pursue higher education. Since 1961, Amondji has lived abroad, writing on politics in Côte d'Ivoire.

Works

Ivorian non-fiction writers
1934 births
Living people
Ivorian emigrants to France
People from Bingerville